The 82nd Street–Jackson Heights station (formerly known as 25th Street (Jackson Heights) station) is a local station on the IRT Flushing Line of the New York City Subway, located at the intersection of 82nd Street and Roosevelt Avenue in Jackson Heights, Queens. It is served by the 7 train at all times.

History

Early history 
The 1913 Dual Contracts called for the Interborough Rapid Transit Company (IRT) and Brooklyn Rapid Transit Company (BRT; later Brooklyn–Manhattan Transit Corporation, or BMT) to build new lines in Brooklyn, Queens, and the Bronx. Queens did not receive many new IRT and BRT lines compared to Brooklyn and the Bronx, since the city's Public Service Commission (PSC) wanted to alleviate subway crowding in the other two boroughs first before building in Queens, which was relatively undeveloped. The IRT Flushing Line was to be one of two Dual Contracts lines in the borough, along with the Astoria Line; it would connect Flushing and Long Island City, two of Queens' oldest settlements, to Manhattan via the Steinway Tunnel. When the majority of the line was built in the early 1910s, most of the route went through undeveloped land, and Roosevelt Avenue had not been constructed. Community leaders advocated for more Dual Contracts lines to be built in Queens to allow development there.

The Flushing Line was opened from Queensboro Plaza to Alburtis Avenue (now 103rd Street–Corona Plaza) on April 21, 1917, with a local station at what is now 82nd Street. The current 82nd Street station was known as "25th Street" from its opening until March 10, 1921, when it was renamed "25th Street (Jackson Heights)". The station was again renamed on April 2, 1925, to "82nd Street–Jackson Heights".

Later years 
The city government took over the IRT's operations on June 12, 1940. The IRT routes were given numbered designations in 1948 with the introduction of "R-type" rolling stock, which contained rollsigns with numbered designations for each service. The route from Times Square to Flushing became known as the 7. On October 17, 1949, the joint BMT/IRT operation of the Flushing Line ended, and the line became the responsibility of the IRT. After the end of BMT/IRT dual service, the New York City Board of Transportation announced that the Flushing Line platforms would be lengthened to 11 IRT car lengths; the platforms were only able to fit nine 51-foot-long IRT cars beforehand. The platforms at the station were extended in 1955–1956 to accommodate 11-car trains. However, nine-car trains continued to run on the 7 route until 1962, when they were extended to ten cars. With the opening of the 1964 New York World's Fair, trains were lengthened to eleven cars. In 1981, the Metropolitan Transportation Authority (MTA) listed the station among the 69 most deteriorated stations in the subway system.

As part of the 2015–2019 Capital Program, the MTA would renovate the 52nd, 61st, 69th, 82nd, 103rd and 111th Streets stations, a project that has been delayed for several years but is slated to begin in mid-2020. Conditions at these stations were among the worst of all stations in the subway system.

Station layout

This elevated station has three tracks and two side platforms. The center track is used by the peak direction rush hour <7> express service. Both platforms have beige windscreens and brown canopies supported by green frames and columns in the center and black waist-high steel fences at either ends. The station signs are in the standard black name plate in white lettering. Each platform has a large "82" sign between the two staircases to the mezzanine below.

Exits

This station's one entrance/exit is an elevated station house beneath the tracks. It is built of wood and bricks and has a concrete flooring. It has three staircases from all corners of 82nd Street and Roosevelt Avenue except the southeast one and a token booth in the center. Two turnstile banks at either ends lead to a waiting area/crossunder and one staircase to each platform at the center.

References

External links 

 
 Station Reporter – 7 Train
 The Subway Nut – 82nd Street–Jackson Heights Pictures 
 82nd Street entrance from Google Maps Street View
 Platforms from Google Maps Street View

IRT Flushing Line stations
New York City Subway stations in Queens, New York
Railway stations in the United States opened in 1917
1917 establishments in New York City
Jackson Heights, Queens